Pseudopostega ovatula is a moth of the family Opostegidae. It is known only from lowland and pre-montane Amazonian rainforest in east-central Ecuador.

The length of the forewings is 2.1–2.3 mm. Adults are mostly white. Adults are on wing in January.

Etymology
The species name is derived from the Latin ovata (ovally rounded) in reference to the ovally rounded vinculum and the same rounded gnathal lobe of the male, and the distinctive semi-ovally shaped terminal strigula on forewing.

External links
A Revision of the New World Plant-Mining Moths of the Family Opostegidae (Lepidoptera: Nepticuloidea)

Opostegidae
Moths described in 2007